Dr. P B Salim is an IAS officer of the 2001 batch belonging to the West Bengal cadre. He hails from the south Indian state of Kerala.

Career 
Dr. Salim served in a mix of assignments in West Bengal and Kerala. He started his career as Sub Divisional Officer Barrackpore and thereafter as OSD & under Secretary, Home Department, Govt. of West Bengal; Additional District Magistrate of South 24 Parganas District; General Manager, Kerala State Civil Supplies Corporation. He served as District Magistrate in two districts of Kerala viz. Kozhikode and Kannur and thereafter in two districts of West Bengal viz. Nadia and South 24 Parganas. He served as CEO, Rastriya Swastha Bima Yojana (RSBY) and National Rural Livelihood Mission (NRLM) in West Bengal.

In 2019 he began serving as the Chairman & Managing Director of West Bengal Power Development Corporation Limited (WBPDCL). He holds additional position as Secretary, Chief Minister's Office (CMO) Public Grievances Cell, West Bengal. He is also the CEO and nodal officer of Bangla Sahayata Kendra.

Recognition

Publications

 Malabar Heritage and Culture editor along with Prof Hafis Muhammed and Prof N. C. Vasisht, by Mathrubhumi Publishers
 101 Success Stories, editor along with Dr Muhammed, by Mathrubhumi Publishers

Completed projects

 SPARSAM (Sustainable Project for Poverty alleviation and Reformation of the Seabelt Areas of Malabar) – Healing the wounds of Marad
SPARSAM is an innovative effort in riot victims’ rehabilitation formulated, organized and executed by the District Administration of Kozhikode. This project was formulated with a view to bridge the gap by gaining the willing participation of the riot victims from the core area of Marad. Realizing that sermons and soaps can't heal the wounds- efforts were made to bring people, especially ladies who acted as a deadly force in the communal flare-ups, to come together and work in groups in various employment programs thus generating a sense of interdependence and understanding even without they themselves knowing about it.

 Sneha Sangamam – a brave effort in communal harmony
Sneha Sangamam was an effort to re assert our common heritage and brotherhood. Organized with the theme of ‘heritage of humanism’ – the three day event made history through participation of all sections of society and also the brave and non-traditional way of doing the same. The three day event included a historic exhibition showcasing the rich, secular and common heritage of our society; cultural programs again highlighting the theme ‘ heritage of humanism’ , which included among other things the first ever public stage performance of ‘mappila ramayanam’- Ramayana written in the mappila traditions exemplifying the confluence of cultures. The ultimate of the event was the two processions took out from the most venerated temple (the Tali Mahadeva Temple) and the most venerated mosque (Kuttichira Miskal mosque) of the city, with tens of thousands of people, which later joined and intermixed to form a single procession and culminated in the city square followed by public meeting. The meeting was addressed by personalities like jnanpeet awardee Dr U R Anantamurti, Principal Secy. to PM Shri T K A Nair IAS besides others. All of them, without any exception, lauded the brave effort and hoped for similar efforts of bringing together people from all communities in such well thought out ways, in all other districts of the country.

 Snehapookalam – World's largest floral carpet on Harmony
During the last Onam (the national festival of Keralites) season, Kerala had a special reason to rejoice, as the world's largest floral carpet of harmony was created. The Guinness record breaking ‘Manavamaithri Snehapookalam’ (Floral Carpet of Harmony), the world's largest and fastest floral carpet, was created with 14.7 tonns of fresh flowers and measured 17,662.5sq.ft by 5000 participants in 2.08 hrs. The participants included nuns, bishops, sanyasis, imams, madrasa students, teachers, students, trade unionists, drivers, lawyers, policemen, housewives, political and social functionaries.

 Swabhiman – service on call
In the Swabhiman initiative by the District Administration of Kozhikode, seven trades which are in huge demand from the society like electrician, plumber, coconut plucker, gas stove mechanic etc. were identified and eligible unemployed youth from the locality were recruited. They were given motivational training, revitalizing their self esteem by providing them with a uniform, a befitting name (swabhiman meaning self-respect) and photo identity cards to be issued by the authority, and made their services available to the general public through click of a mouse or sms or phone booking. Now the service of this highly motivated labour bank of skilled personnel are available in the district ever ready to provide their services to the society. The Govt. of Kerala is in the process of replicating this model to other cities and parts of our state.

 Automation of the issuance of certificates
In Kozhikode District, the entire process of certificate issuance, i.e. starting from receiving the application for the required certificates to printing and delivery of the certificates has been automated wherein the applicant is issued a computer generated receipt indicating the date and time of delivery of their certificate, not later than 48hrs of submission of the application. The system is currently working to the full satisfaction of general public.

 Nirmman – Online sand distribution system
The scheme demonstrates unflinching commitment towards protection and prevention of over exploitation of natural resources in a country like India. Nirmman online sand distribution system was introduced in the district of Kozhikode to streamline mining and distribution of sand from river beds. The system works similar to the now famous railway ticket reservation system, where in the customers can book for sand, based on documents showing genuineness of the customer and his purpose through Akshaya (computer) centers and based on the reservation tokens issued through akshaya centers sand shall be provided from river fronts (kadavu) in the district, subject to an upper ceiling. The system has brought in much needed transparency and dispelled the mystery surrounding sand distribution. Not only has it brought down corruption in the sector substantially, but also ensured equality of opportunity for the citizens and greatly reduced the overexploitation of our precious natural resources.

 Staying with Tribal families
The scheme demonstrated commitment to the welfare of weaker sections of our society. To have a first-hand experience of the living conditions and difficulties of the tribal families and to find out solutions, Dr. Salim took the brave and unconventional step of taking district level officers of all Govt. departments in visiting the most backward and isolated tribal colonies of the district. They ate with the tribals and spent night along with them in their huts. He sorted out many issues on the spot like issuance of temporary ration cards to families without card, including homeless tribals in some housing schemes etc. With this he initiated a project on converting all tribal colonies in the district as model colonies with all facilities.

 Voter SMS project
The VOTER SMS is a novel idea executed, to provide electoral roll information to the citizens through SMS facility. In this vibrant democracy like India, every citizen is keen to know whether his name is included in the voters list and if so the details of polling booth etc. to cast his vote. This project helps the citizen of Kozhikode district to check the Electoral Roll details through the facility of SMS. In this system one can send an sms to the no 9446460600 in a simple format, and within seconds one shall get all the required details regarding their electoral roll. The system is proactive in the sense that it sends reminder sms to all citizens of the district reminding them to check their voting rights using this system.

 MAP- Kozhikode (Mass Action for Plastic Waste Free Kozhikode)
A peoples' movement for making the district plastic waste free. Kozhikode district administration had launched a project called "Plastic waste Free Kozhikode". The project was launched on 2nd Oct, 2009. The campaign aims to achieve the target by enforcing action against users of banned plastic items ( less than 30 mic); completely avoiding the use of use-and-throw plastic products through continued and sustained effort. It also aims to set up 1500 resource recovery centers ( collection points ) and 12 recycling units to recycle the unavoidable plastic wastes.

 ANGELS: Active Network Group of Emergency Life Savers
An innovative project by the district administration of Kozhikode, this involves networking of existing ambulances in the district ( 100 out of the total of 208 ambulances in the district), equipping them with navigational devices, upgrading their facilities of patient care through sponsorship from the market. It is being implemented with the objective to enhance and enforce the pre- hospital care, to reduce the mortality and morbidity of victims of trauma / emergency cases outside the hospitals and delivering the health care system at the door step of the needy.

Planned initiatives

 Kudumbini – Rural BPO
Taking the Business Process Outsourcing success story of India from its metros and cities to rural households. A visionary initiative by Dr. Salim in empowering educated women compelled to live as house-wife and at the same time ensuring participation of women in nation building. Now many MNC's are    outsourcing their jobs to Kudumbini BPO project, where in hundreds of selected rural housewife's, who had no chances of working outside their houses    because of many socio- religious customs have now been freed to a new lease of life through Dr. Salim's novel intervention.

 Community radio for the rural poor (Malabar community radio)
Another example to his vision and commitment to the society at large, he has initiated a radio owned and operated by the community for the benefit of the community .Though there are NGOs running community radios in other parts of our country, community radio initiative by a district administration must be first of its kind in the country. The initiative has been taken with the objective of giving the talented persons in rural areas, especially the house wives without access to metros, to share their experiences and also air their artistic talents. This is intended to strengthen and energize the social and communal fabric of our society which is our greatest asset.

These are some of the un- conventional methods and projects formulated and executed by my team, with the objective of maximizing the utilization of our scarce resources efficiently in empowering millions and ensuring social cohesion.

 Sabar Shouchagar (Toilets for all)
“Sabar Shouchagar”, meaning “toilets for all” a thought that was later actualized by the district leadership collectively overcoming challenges such as correct situation analysis, information management, participatory planning to enable implementing a convergent social engineering program for providing access to latrine for all families in the district, within the given financial, technical and human resource constraints of a low priority development program in India. The experience from two years of implementation informs that by involving and motivating key stakeholders, use of innovative communication approaches for mass mobilization of communities, making them aware of the health hazards of the Open Defecation; developing systems for improving service delivery of sanitary toilets, triggering the collective behavior change for stopping open defecation, have transformed the environment in the district, whereby it has become possible achieving an Open Defecation free district.

References 

Year of birth missing (living people)
Living people